The siege of Narbonne was a conflict between the Visigothic Foederati of Aquitania and the Western Roman Empire.

History 
The siege began in late 436 and carried over into 437, when the Roman Magister Militum Litorius arrived with a force of Huns and the Gallic Field Army. Litorius surprised the Visigoths and routed their army before they could draw up a coherent battle line. Prosper of Aquitaine records that to alleviate the starvation of the city, each soldier in Litorius' army was ordered to carry two measures of wheat for the citizens of Narbonne.

References 

436
History of Narbonne
Narbonne 436
Battles involving the Huns
Narbonne
Narbonne
Narbonne 436
5th century in sub-Roman Gaul
430s in the Roman Empire